Strontium-89 is a radioactive isotope of strontium produced by nuclear fission, with a half-life of 50.57 days. It undergoes β− decay into yttrium-89. Strontium-89 has an application in medicine.

History 
Strontium-89 was first synthesized in 1937 by D. W. Stewart et al. at the University of Michigan; it was synthesized via irradiation of stable strontium (88Sr) with deuterons. Biological properties and applications of strontium-89 were studied for the first time by Belgian scientist Charles Pecher. Pecher filed a patent in May 1941 for the synthesis of strontium-89 and yttrium-86 using cyclotrons, and described the therapeutic use of strontium.

Physiological effects and medical use

Strontium belongs to the same periodic family as calcium (alkaline earth metals), and is metabolised in a similar fashion, preferentially targeting metabolically active regions of the bone.  89Sr is an artificial radioisotope used in the treatment of osseous (bony) metastases of bone cancer.

In circumstances where cancer patients have widespread and painful bony metastases, the administration of 89Sr results in the delivery of beta particles directly to the area of bony problem, where calcium turnover is greatest. Consequently, intravenous or intracavity administration of 89Sr may be helpful in the palliation of painful bony metastases, as it allows radiation to be targeted at metastatic lesions, inducing apoptosis of cells, membrane and protein damage. Subsequently, bone pain resulting from cytokine release at the site of lesions, bone-associated nerve compression and stretching of the periosteum may be reduced. Treatment with 89Sr has been particularly effective in patients with hormonally-resistant prostate cancer, often leading to a decreased requirement for opioid analgesics, an increase in time until further radiation is needed, and a decrease in tumour markers.

See also
 Isotopes of strontium
 Alpharadin, radium-223 with similar clinical use

References

Strontium-089
Medical isotopes